is a Japanese classical pianist. She gave the world premiere of Chopin Piano Concertos in E minor Op. 11 and F minor Op. 21 in the version for one piano as published in the National Edition.

Biography

Education 
After graduating from Nagoya Municipal Kikuzato High School Music Department, she studied piano, organ, conducting and chamber music under Professor   Atsuko Ohori, Professor Both Lehel and Yuzo Toyama at Aichi Prefectural University of Arts and Music.She studied at Chopin Music Academy in Warsaw (Fryderyk Chopin University of Music in Warsaw) and gained her diploma in 1994.

Relationship with Jan Ekier 
During her postgraduate studies in Aichi, her talent was spotted by Professor Jan Ekier, during his visit to Japan. They met in Nagoya and Ekier invited her to Warsaw.

Ekier visited Japan five times. His last visit was early in spring in 1990. He gave Chopin lectures and master-classes all over Japan. In 1990 Kawai was studying at Aichi Prefectural University of Arts and Music and attended his lesson in Nagoya. She played Chopin's Sonata in B minor Op.58. After the lesson Ekier immediately told Kawai to come to Poland, to his class at Chopin Music Academy in Warsaw. During the Japan tour Ekier had lessons with over 60 pianists, mainly Chopin Competition participants in October 1990, but only Kawai was invited as his pupil. At that time Ekier told the masterclass interpreter about Kawai: "She has great potential. And she has very good hands as a pianist."

Performances 
Kawai has performed throughout Europe and Japan. She is especially known for playing Chopin, according to National Edition. Since 2001 she has given recitals of Chopin's entire output on the basis of the National Edition.

Yuko Kawai & Chopin National Edition
Kawai met Jan Ekier's Chopin Urtext Edition when she was a junior high school student - Wiener Urtext Edition Chopin Nocturnes. Since she came to Poland to study with Ekier in 1991, she has used Chopin National Edition. Also, in 1991 Kawai obtained Ekier's book "Introduction to the National Edition".
 
In 2010 Kawai had her own TV programme series 'Yuko Kawai talks about Chopin National Edition' on CLASSICA JAPAN TV (vol.1-13, July–September 2010). In 2011 the programme won prestigious Japan Satellite Broadcasting Association Original Programming Awards.

Discography

・CHOPIN Lento… and other works (BeArTon)

・CHOPIN Various Compositions (BeArTon)

・CHOPIN Piano Concertos single piano version (BeArTon)

・CHOPIN Ballades/Impromptus (Gakken/Platz)

・Chopinissimo I (Imagine)

・Chopinissimo II (Imagine)

・Chopinissimo III (Imagine)

・Chopinissimo IV (Imagine)

・Chopinissimo V (Imagine)

・Chopinissimo VI (Imagine)

・Chopinissimo VII (Imagine)

・Chopinissimo VIII (Imagine)

References

External links
 Yuko Kawai Official Website
 ARTE 90
 Concert Imagine
 BeArTon
 Yuko Kawai Facebook (Page)
 Yuko Kawai Facebook (People)
 Yuko Kawai Twitter
 Interview 'Pianist Kawai seeks out the real Chopin' - The Japan Times

Year of birth missing (living people)
20th-century births
Living people
People from Nagoya
Japanese classical pianists
Japanese women pianists
Women classical pianists
21st-century classical pianists
21st-century Japanese women musicians
Aichi Prefectural University of the Arts alumni
21st-century women pianists